Jayender Kumar Dabas is an Indian politician and municipal councillor. He is Chairman, Narela Zone, North Delhi Municipal Corporation (NDMC; North DMC). A member of the Bharatiya Janata Party (BJP), he represents Ward 36, Rani Khera, which is in North West Delhi, within the NDMC.

Early life and education
Jayender Kumar Dabas was born on 1 January 1967 in Madanpur Dabas village, North West District of Delhi, to Mahabir Singh, a farmer, and Channo Devi. He was educated to twelfth grade and then completed an industrial training institute (ITI) certificate course at Delhi in 1988.

Post held
He began his socio-political journey as a volunteer in the Rashtriya Swayamsevak Sangh and later worked in the BJP on various posts.

Electoral politics
Jayender Kumar Dabas is a member of the Bharatiya Janata Party (BJP). For his first term as Councillor, he defeated Krishan Rathi of Aam Aadmi Party (AAP) by a margin of 5989 votes in the 2017 Municipal Corporation of Delhi election. He also worked as DDA (Delhi Development Authority) Member. He is Chairman, Narela Zone, NMCD.

References 

Living people
People from New Delhi
Bharatiya Janata Party politicians from Delhi
1968 births